is a Japanese light novel series written by Kennoji and illustrated by Fly. It started publishing on the user-generated novel publishing website Shōsetsuka ni Narō in May 2019 and it ended in December 2020. The first novel volume was released in print by SB Creative's GA Bunko imprint in February 2020. A manga adaptation, illustrated by You Midorikawa, started in Square Enix's Manga UP! website in October 2020.

Media

Light novel
Written by Kennoji, The Girl I Saved on the Train Turned Out to Be My Childhood Friend started on the user-generated novel publishing website Shōsetsuka ni Narō on May 21, 2019, and the last chapter was published on December 15, 2020; the series was removed from the platform in late March of 2021. The first novel volume, illustrated by Fly, was released by SB Creative's GA Bunko imprint on February 14, 2020. As of October 14, 2022, seven volumes have been released.

The novel has been licensed for English release in North America by Yen Press.

Manga
A manga adaptation, illustrated by You Midorikawa, started on Square Enix's Manga UP! website on October 7, 2020. Square Enix has collected its chapters into individual tankōbon volumes. The first volume was released on May 7, 2021. As of January 7, 2023, seven volumes have been released.

The series has been licensed for English release in North America by Yen Press.

References

Further reading

External links
  
  
 

2020 Japanese novels
Anime and manga based on light novels
GA Bunko
Gangan Comics manga
Japanese webcomics
Light novels
Light novels first published online
Romantic comedy anime and manga
Shōnen manga
Shōsetsuka ni Narō
Webcomics in print
Yen Press titles